Philippe Pugnat (born 10 September 1959 in Sallanches) is a retired French alpine skier who competed in the men's downhill at the 1980 Winter Olympics, finishing 25th.

External links
 sports-reference.com
 

1959 births
Living people
French male alpine skiers
Olympic alpine skiers of France
Alpine skiers at the 1980 Winter Olympics
Sportspeople from Haute-Savoie